Real Madri Futebol Clube, commonly known as Real Madri, is a Brazilian football club based in Colatina, Espírito Santo state.

History
The club was founded on August 15, 1958. They competed in 1993, in the first edition of the Campeonato Capixaba Second Level. The club competed again in 1994, failing to gain promotion to the Campeonato Capixaba First Level in both seasons.

Stadium
Real Madri Futebol Clube play their home games at Estádio Eugênio Menegueli. The stadium has a maximum capacity of 1,500 people.

References

Association football clubs established in 1958
Defunct football clubs in Espírito Santo
1958 establishments in Brazil